Budzyń concentration camp was a forced labor and concentration camp built and operated by the SS of Nazi Germany between the Spring of 1942 and June/July 1944. It was located in the industrial district of Kraśnik, Poland, in the Lublin District of the General Government territory of German-occupied Poland. Budzyń began as a sub-camp of the Majdanek concentration camp, but became an independent concentration camp in October 1943 after the deportation of over 1,000 Jews after the Warsaw Ghetto Uprising.

At its peak, over 3,000 prisoners were forced laborers at the camp, working in military factories such as the Heinkel aircraft factory, or conducting manual labor.

History

The first transports of Jews to the camp in Budzyń began in spring 1942. By the summer, there were 500 Jews from Kraśnik, Bełżyce, Janów Lubelski, Mińsk, Mohylów, Smoleńsk, Vienna, and Slovakia. By the summer of 1942, 500 Jews were brought to the camp from nearby towns. That fall, 400 prisoners of war arrived from the ghettos in Końskowola and Lublin, while 100 sick, elderly, and very young inmates were deported to Belzec concentration camp.

After the defeat of the Warsaw Ghetto Uprising, the Nazis deported more than 1,000 Jews from Warsaw to Budzyń. By mid-1943, there were 3,000 people imprisoned in the camp, including 300 women and children. In August 1943, 200 of the camp's prisoners were sent to Majdanek. On October 22, 1943 Budzyn was declared an independent concentration camp.

On February 8, 1944, dozens of prisoners were massacred by Ukrainian guards.

Conditions in Budzyn were somewhat bearable, due to the efforts of the Nazi-appointed camp elder, Noah Stockman. In one case, some prisoners stole weapons from the military factories where they worked and escaped to the forest to join the Partisans. Stockman was able to convince the camp authorities not to retaliate against the Jews. On Passover 1944, Stockman managed to have matzah baked in the camp and hold a Seder for the Jewish holiday of Passover. In July 1944, Budzyn was evacuated and the prisoners were sent to nearby camps at Płaszów and Mauthausen.

Notable inmates
 Max Glauben - activist and educator who co-founded the Dallas Holocaust Museum
 Laura Hillman - a Schindlerjude, who survived the Holocaust with the help of Oskar Schindler
 Stephan Ross - activist who spearheaded the creation of the New England Holocaust Memorial in Boston, Massachusetts
 Jack Terry

See also
 List of Nazi concentration camps

References

1942 in Poland
1943 in Poland
1944 in Poland
World War II sites of Nazi Germany
German extermination camps in Poland